Secret Mission is a 1950 Soviet drama film directed by Mikhail Romm.

Plot 
The film tells about the Soviet scout Marta Shirka, which the fascists expose.

Starring 
 Nikolai Komissarov as Senator
 Sergei Vecheslov as Gawrey
 Yelena Kuzmina as Marta Shirke
 Aleksey Gribov as General
 Aleksandr Cheban as General
 Aleksandr Antonov
 Vladimir Belokurov as Bormann
 Pyotr Berezov as Himmler (as Pavel Beryozov)
 Pavel Gaideburov as Rogers
 Vladimir Gardin as Dillon
  as Krupp
 Vasili Makarov as Dementiev
 Aleksandr Pelevin as Schellenberg
 Mark Pertsovskiy as Kaltenbrunner
 Nikolai Rybnikov as Vanderkorn
 Vladimir Savelev as Hitler
 Nikolay Trofimov
 Mikhail Vysotsky	
 Vladimir Gotovtsev as GerMan magnate

References

External links 
 

1950 drama films
1950 films
Films scored by Aram Khachaturian
1950s Russian-language films
Soviet black-and-white films
Soviet drama films